The Department of Management Studies, School of Management, Pondicherry University (DMS SOM) is a department of the Pondicherry University School of Management of Pondicherry University, India for MBA studies. It was established in 1986.

History
DMS SOM established the MBA program of the university in 1986. It caters for MBA teaching, Management research, Organisational management, government officers training, industrial consulting and management extension, with a team of three professors, nine associate professors and two readers.

Location 
It is accessible from Chennai (168 km) and Bangalore (300 km). The School of Management (SOM) is the first academic entity of the university established as a centre of Excellence and a stand-alone school in 1986. Then in 2005, SOM was reconstructed which includes the Department of Management Studies as the parent department and five other departments.

Profile
DMS SOM is funded and supported by the University Grants Commission (India) (UGC) and accreditation from National Assessment and Accreditation Council (NAAC)

MBA program
The two-year (four semesters) full-time MBA in DMS SOM prepares student for a professional career in management. While the first year is devoted to foundational course, the second year enables the students to gain breadth and depth of different areas and specialize in the selective fields. The students have choice to choose one major and/or one minor as specialization.

Evaluation of the students is on the basis of their performance in assignments, participation in departmental activities, projects, tests, classroom presentations, quizzes, case studies and end semester examinations.

Annual events

Synapse

Synapse is an industry interface event where CEOs, entrepreneurs, leaders and corporate people are invited to speak on management-related topics.

Electives offered 
 Finance
 Marketing
 Human Resources
 Operations

Recognitions 
 Recipient of STAR NEWS Outstanding B-School( south) of the year 2010
 Rated #6 among Top 10 B-School in South India by INDIAN EXPRESS 2010
 Rated #19 in the category of top B-Schools of excellence in India (CSR-GHRD Survey, 2010)
 Rated #3 in the country among the government universities B-School (CSR-GHRD Survey, 2009)
 Ranked #1 in the country among all the B-schools considering the fees paid by students (CSR-GHRD Survey, 2008)
 Rated A+ (Business India survey 2008)
 Rated #4 in the country among the government university B-Schools (AIMA Survey, 2008)
 Accredited by NAAC-UGC
 Approved by the AICTE

List of faculty 
 Dr R Paneerselvam – Operations Management & Systems
 Dr R P Raya – Human Resource Management
 Dr T Nambirajan – Productions and Operations Management
 Dr Chitra Sivasubramanian – Human Resource Management
 Dr Uma Chandrasekaran –  Marketing
 Dr B Charumathi – Finance Management
 Dr S Victor Anand Kumar – Marketing and Information System
 Dr R Kasilingam –  Finance, Business Law and Business analytics
 Dr R Venkatesakumar –  Marketing and Quantitative Methods
 Dr L Motilal – Business Environment and Public Systems Management
 Dr K Lavanyalatha – Human Resource Management & Marketing
 Dr S Riasudeen –  Human Resource Management/Management Group Dynamics
 Dr B Rajeswari –  Marketing Management, Operation Management, Strategic Management
 Dr G Madan Mohan- Managerial Economics And Financial Management

References

 https://web.archive.org/web/20200419073809/http://www.pondiuni.edu.in/
 https://web.archive.org/web/20110207125436/http://dmssom.com/

External links
 Pondicherry University
 Department management

Educational institutions established in 1985
Business schools in Puducherry
Universities and colleges in Pondicherry (city)
University departments in India
1985 establishments in Pondicherry